De occulta philosophia may refer to:
 Three Books of Occult Philosophy, a book by Heinrich Cornelius Agrippa von Nettesheim
 De occulta philosophia (album), an album by Blood of Kingu